Silview is an unincorporated community in New Castle County, Delaware, United States. Silview is located along Delaware Route 4, west of Newport.

References

Unincorporated communities in New Castle County, Delaware
Unincorporated communities in Delaware